BHK is a three-letter abbreviation that may refer to:

 BHK interpretation of intuitionistic predicate logic
 Baby hamster kidney cells used in molecular biology
 Bachelor of Human Kinetics (BHk) degree.
 Baltische Historische Kommission, organization dealing with history of Baltic Germans
 Biblia Hebraica (Kittel), by Rudolf Kittel
 Bush Hill Park railway station, London, UK, National Rail station code
 Bukhara International Airport, Uzbekistan, IATA code
 Prosperous Armenia, Armenian political party
 Bedroom - Hall - Kitchen, as used in India to describe apartments: 2 BHK, 3 BHK… — see Wiktionary:BHK